Hydnocarpus cucurbitinus is a species of plant in the Achariaceae family. It is a tree endemic to Peninsular Malaysia. It is threatened by habitat loss.

References

cucurbitina
Endemic flora of Peninsular Malaysia
Trees of Peninsular Malaysia
Conservation dependent plants
Taxonomy articles created by Polbot
Taxobox binomials not recognized by IUCN